Antricola marginatus is a species of tick in the family Argasidae. Like Nothoaspis, another genus in the same family, Antricola species infest cave-dwelling bats; A. marginatus is found on Cuba and Puerto Rico. Unusually for a tick, A. marginatus shows maternal care of its offspring.

These ticks are considered soft ticks, because of their subterminal capitulum (head) found in nymphs (juvenile ticks with a full complement of legs) and adult ticks. The capitulum of these ticks can not be seen in dorsal view because it lies within a groove or depression called a camerostome.  The dorsal wall of the camerostome extends over the capitulum and is called the hood.

References

Ticks
Parasites of bats
Arthropods of Cuba
Arthropods of Puerto Rico
Animals described in 1910
Argasidae